The Muna is a river in the Sakha Republic, Russia.

Course
It flows roughly eastwards in a deep valley and, after leaving the mountainous region it meanders across the Central Yakutian Lowland among almost 2,500 lakes, almost parallel to the Motorchuna to the north. The river broadens in the plain, reaching a width of  when it meets the left bank of the lower course of the Lena.   

The Muna freezes between the end of November and the beginning of December and remains under ice until the end of April or the beginning of May. From the end of May to June it flows at a high level, flooding sometimes in the summer. The area of the river basin is uninhabited. The mouth of the river is in the Zhigansky District.

Tributaries

See also
List of rivers of Russia

References

External links 
 Fishing on the Muna river
 Geography - Yakutia Organized
Rivers of the Sakha Republic
Central Yakutian Lowland
Tributaries of the Lena